A referendum on self-determination for Algeria was held in France on 8 January 1961. Self-determination was approved by 75% of voters overall and 70% in Algeria. Voter turnout was 92%.
The referendum question was worded as follows:

Results

References

See also 
1962 Algerian independence referendum

Algerian self-determination
Referendums in Algeria
Autonomy referendums
Algeria–France relations
French Algeria
1961 referendums
1961 elections in France
1961 in international relations
1961 in Algeria